Beaver Pass can refer to:

One of two mountain passes in British Columbia:
Beaver Pass (Cariboo)
Beaver Pass (Selkirks)
Beaver Pass (Washington)
Beaver Pass (Idaho)